Åbygda is a village in the municipality of Bindal in Nordland county, Norway.

Åbygda is the birthplace of Otto Sverdrup, a polar explorer, who was the skipper on the polar expedition ship Fram to both the North Pole and South Pole.

References

Villages in Nordland
Bindal